Roudram is a 2008 Indian Malayalam-language action crime film written and directed by Renji Panicker. It stars Mammootty, Sai Kumar, Vijayaraghavan and Rajan P Dev.

Plot
In Kochi, Kambilikkandam Jose is a drug baron who arrives to meet Pattakkalil Purushothaman "Appichai" Pilla, one of the largest drug dealers in South India, for a massive hike in his commission. Appichai arrives, along with his foster son Sethumadhavan "Sethu". Appichai calls Sethu, who is on a cruise in Goa. Upon his return to Kochi, Sethu kills Jose with the help from IG Balagopal. The death brings on a strong protest inside the state, causing the C.M. to order a detailed investigation. 

ACP Narendran "Nari", is in-charge of the inquiry. Widely known for his aggressive and belligerent behavior, Narendra begins the investigation by questioning Dr. Ratnakumari (the assistant surgeon who conducted the postmortem examination on Jose). Narendran finds the marks of physical attack on Jose's face that were not reported, where he  reaches out to meet Jose's family, but all of them are found dead the next day. Sethu, who holds an illegal business partnership with the C.M.'s son Jeevan, one of the most influential businessmen in the country. 

Hiding in an ashram named Karunyadeepam, under Rema Behan, Sethu runs a drug cartel. Through his investigative methods, Narendran reaches out to Rema Behan, who is found dead the following day. Eventually, Narendran encounters obstacles, including Jeevan and several senior cops, where he is discharged from the investigation, but Narendran blackmails the C.M. with a video clip on Jeevan, given by Sethu. The C.M. lets Narendran to begin with the investigation. 

Narendran arrests Sethu, who threatened Appichai, since Narendran had given him 24 hours to reveal information on Sethu. When Narendran and Sethu arrives at a safe place. Helan's brothers arrive and tries to kill Sethu, but Narendran kills them instead. Sethu shoots Narendran in the arm, and Narendra responds by shooting Sethu in the leg, where he also shoots the car hanging from the garage ceiling, which crushes Sethu's legs. Narendra leaves the garage along with Shihabudden, Thomas and Hamza, while Sethu bleeds to death.

Cast

Release
Roudram was released on 25 January 2008 in India, with a subsequent release on 6 March 2008 in Kuwait. The film became a commercial success at the box office.

References

External links 
 
2008 films
2000s Malayalam-language films
2000s masala films
Fictional portrayals of the Kerala Police
Indian action thriller films
Films shot in Kochi
2008 action thriller films